Julien Freund (8 January 1921 – 10 September 1993) was a French philosopher and sociologist. Freund was called an "unsatisfied liberal-conservative" by Pierre-André Taguieff, for introducing France to the ideas of Max Weber. His work as a sociologist and political theorist is a continuation of Carl Schmitt's. Freund, like many people from Alsace, was fluent in German and French. His works have been translated into nearly 20 languages.

Biography 
Born in Henridorff (Moselle) on 8 January 1921, to a peasant mother and a socialist working class father, Freund was the eldest of six siblings. When his father died he had to end his studies. He became a teacher aged 17, and secretary to the council in his hometown.

His brother Antoine, conscripted against his will into the Wehrmacht, was injured in the battle of Orel in Russia and then deserted. This should have caused the deportation of his family, who were also aiding the resistance in Lorraine. However, they were able to destroy the Gestapo-held documents relating to their proposed deportation.

The resistance 
During World War II, Freund was a member of the resistance. A member of the Libération group founded by Jean Cavaillès, he was taken hostage by the Germans in July 1940. He managed to escape to the Free Zone of France. In January 1941, he began fighting for the Libération movement of Emmanuel d’Astier de la Vigerie, then in combat groups run by Henri Frenay, all the while getting his degree in philosophy.

Arrested in June 1942 in Clermont-Ferrand, then again in September in Lyon, he was accused alongside Emmanuel Mounier in the trial of Combat. Jailed in the central prison of Elysses, then in the fortress of Sisteron, he escaped on 8 June 1944. Returning to Strasbourg in November 1944, he became a journalist and political activist.

Academic career 
Initially, Freund was a young teacher in Hommarting (Moselle). He then became professor of philosophy in collège Mangin de Sarrebourg (1946–49), lycée Fabert de Metz (1949–53) and then the lycée Fustel de Coulanges de Strasbourg (1953–60). From 1960 to 1965, he was a head of research at CNRS. In 1965, the year of his thesis at Sorbonne, he was elected professor of sociology at the University of Strasbourg, where he founded the departement of social sciences. He then taught from 1973 to 1975 at the College of Europe in Bruges, then in 1975 at Université de Montréal.

Beliefs 
Freund was a support of limited democracy and that growing democratisation increases the reach of government, allowing it to become ever more invasive. Politics, Freund believed, cannot solve any cultural problems or impose social values upon society, and it should not be involved in religious affairs. Equally, religion also cannot impose upon the principles of democracy. Freund's work also drew attention to the corruption of language and its misuse in  democracy: "La démocratie se décompose quand elle dilapide la sincérité en démagogie et en flatterie" - "Democracy breaks down when it squanders sincerity in demagoguery and flattery."

His idea of "mesocracy" was first used in 1978, against the overuse and overreach of democracy. Mesocracy from its Greek roots, is a form of power that exists in tandem with other 'counter powers'. Rather than speaking of a singular, abstract “freedom”, Freund preferred to refer to specific freedoms, freedom of the press, of association, of conscience etc. Without such concrete freedoms, Freund argued, we will never have freedom in the singular.

Bibliography 
 L’Essence du politique (Sirey, 1965 ; Dalloz, 2003, 870 p.).
 Sociologie de Max Weber (PUF, 1966 et 1983). 
 Europa ohne Schminke (Drückerei Winkelhagen, Goslar 1967). 
 Qu’est-ce que la politique ? (Seuil, 1968 et 1978). 
 Max Weber (Collection « Sup-Philosophie » PUF, 1969). 
 Le Nouvel âge. Éléments pour la théorie de la démocratie et de la paix (Marcel Rivière, 1970). 
 Le Droit d’aujourd’hui (PUF, 1972). 
 Les Théories des sciences humaines (PUF, 1973). 
 Pareto. La théorie de l’équilibre (Seghers, 1974). 
 Georges Sorel. Eine geistige Biographie (Siemens-Stiftung, Munich 1977). 
 Les Problèmes nouveaux posés à la politique de nos jours (Université européenne des affaires, 1977), 
 Utopie et violence (Marcel Rivière, 1978). 
 Il luogo della violenza (Cappelli, Bologna 1979).
 La Fin de la Renaissance (PUF, 1980). 
 La crisis del Estado y otros estudios (Instituto de Ciencia política, Santiago de Chile 1982). 
 Idées et expériences. Les activités sociales : regards d’un sociologue (Institut des Sciences Politiques et Sociales de l’U.C.L., Louvain-la-Neuve 1983).
 Sociologie du conflit (PUF, 1983). 
 Idées et expériences (Institut de sociologie de l’UCL, Louvain-la-Neuve 1983). 
 La Décadence. Histoire sociologique et philosophique d’une catégorie de l’expérience humaine (Sirey, 1984). 
 Philosophie et sociologie (Cabay, Louvain-la-Neuve 1984).
 Politique et impolitique (Sirey, 1987).
 Philosophie philosophique (Découverte, 1990). 
 Études sur Max Weber (Droz, Genève 1990). 
 Essais de sociologie économique et politique (Faculté catholique Saint-Louis, Bruxelles 1990). 
 L’Aventure du politique. Entretiens avec Charles Blanchet (Critérion, 1991). 
 D’Auguste Comte à Max Weber (Economica, 1992).
 L’Essence de l’économique (Presses universitaires de Strasbourg, Strasbourg 1993).
 Diritto e Politica. Saggi di filosofia giuridica (Edizioni Scientifiche Italiane, Napoli 1994).
 Il Terzo, il nemico, il conflitto. Materiali per una teoria del Politico (Giuffrè, Milano 1995).
 Warfare in the modern world: a short but critical analysis (Plutarch Press, Washington D.C. 1996).
 Voci di teoria politica (Antonio Pellicani Editore, Roma, 2001).
 Vista de conjunto sobre la obra de Carl Schmitt (Struhart & Cía., Buenos Aires, 2002).
 Les Lettres de la vallée (non paru).
 Die Industrielle Konfliktgesellschaft(1977)
 Der Unauffindbare Friede(1964 Berlin pour le 75ème anniversaire de Carl Schmitt)
 Die Politik als Heillehre(1974)
 Die Demokratie und das Politische(Berlin 1967 288 pages)
 Die neue Bewertung des Krieges als Mittel der auswärtigen Politik nach 1870(1970)

Translations 
 Max Weber, Le Savant et le Politique, Plon, Paris 1959.
 Max Weber, Essais sur la théorie de la science, Plon, Paris 1965, et Agora/Presses-Pocket, 1992.
 Max Weber, Économie et société, Plon, Paris 1971.

Studies on Julien Freund 
 Revue européenne des sciences sociales, « Critique des théories du social et épistémologie des sciences humaines : études en l’honneur de Julien Freund », 19, no 54-55, Droz, Genève 1981.
 Revue des sciences sociales de la France de l’Est, « Région et conflits. Hommage à Julien Freund » (Strasbourg), no 10.
 Tijdschrift voor de studie van de verlichting en van het vrije denken, "Politiek en decadentie volgens Julien Freund", 11, no 4, 1983. 
 Studi Perugini, Università degli Studi di Perugia, no 1, 1996. 
 Empresas políticas, Sociedad de Estudios Políticos de la Región de Murcia, no 5, 2004. 
 BIHR,A., "L’extrême droite à l’université : le cas Julien Freund",Revue Agone, n° 54, 2014.
 BLANCHET, C., "Julien Freund 1921-1993 Le maître de l’intelligence du politique et notre ami à l’« enfance éternelle »", Paysans (París), vol. 37, nº 221, 1993, pp. 7-20.
 CAMPI, A., Carl Schmitt, Freund, Miglio: figure e temi del realismo politico europeo, La Roccia di Erec, Fiorenza 1996. 
 DELANNOI, G.; HINTERMETER, P.; RAYNAUD, P.; TAGUIEFF, P.-A., Julien Freund La dynamique des conflits, Berg International, Paris, 2011 
 HOLEINDRE, J.-V., "Penser la ruse avec Julien Freund", in: KLINGER, M. (dir.), Héritage et actualité de la polémologie, Tétraèdre, París, 2007, pp. 55–67.
 LE BOT, J.-M., "Julien Freund and the Essence of the Political, a “Mediationnist” Reading", Tétralogiques, n°20, 2015.
 MOLINA CANO, J., La filosofía económica de Julien Freund ante la economía moderna, Cuadernos Veintiuno, no 10, Madrid 1997. 
 MOLINA CANO, J., Julien Freund, lo político y la política, Sequitur, Madrid, 1999. 
 MOLINA CANO, J., Conflicto, gobierno y economía (cuatro ensayos sobre Julien Freund), Struhart & Cía., Buenos Aires 2004. 
 PAQUOT, T., "Julien Freund, l’intellectuel frontière qui n’a pas de frontière", Revue des sciences sociales, no 40, 2008, p. 154-161.
 TAGUIEFF, P.-A., "Julien Freund, political thinker" (tr. Kathy Ackermann), Telos (NY), nº 125, 2002, pp. 37–68.
 TOUANNE, S. DE LA, Julien Freund — Penseur « machiavélien » de la politique, L’Harmattan, Paris, 2004.
 ULMEN, Gary G., "Reflections of a Partisan: Julien Freund (1921-1993)", Telos(NY), nº 102, 1995, pp. 3–10.
 VALDERRAMA ABENZA, J.C.,Julien Freund, la imperiosa obligación de lo real. Estudio bio-bibliográfico, Sociedad de Estudios Políticos de la Región de Murcia, 2005.
 VALDERRAMA ABENZA, J.C.,"El dolor y la muerte en Julien Freund", in: ANRUBIA, E. (ed.), Filosofías del dolor y la muerte, Comares, Granada 2007, pp. 53-89.
 VALDERRAMA ABENZA, J.C.,"El orden social: Síntesis de la actualidad de las esencias", in: CORBETTA, J. C. & PIANA, R. S., El valor de lo político: Estudios sobre Julien Freund, Prometeo Libros, Buenos Aires 2010, pp. 95–120. 
 VALDERRAMA ABENZA, J.C.,"Julien Freund, analista político. Contextos y perspectivas de investigación", in: SÁNCHEZ GARRIDO, P. & MARTÍNEZ SICLUNA, C.(eds.), Miradas liberales. Análisis político en la Europa del s. XX, Biblioteca Nueva, Madrid 2014.

References

Further reading 
 Un philosophe contre l’angélisme, par Chantal Delsol 
 Julien Freund et l’essence du politique, par Georges Feltin-Tracol
 La grande leçon politique de Julien Freund, par Bernard Quesnay 
 Conversations avec Julien Freund, par Pierre Bérard
 Julien Freund dans le monde 
 La négation de l’ennemi, par Julien Freund 
 Le combat et la lutte, par Julien Freund 
 Julien Freund : la guerre et la paix face au phénoméne politique, par Gilles Renaud
 En souvenir de Julien Freund, par Alessandra Colla
 Entretien avec Julien Freund, par X. Cheneseau
 Julien Freund, « L’Essence du politique », Paris, Éditions Dalloz, 2004, 3e édition, postface de Pierre-André Taguieff, XII-870 pp. compte rendu (en italien) par Carlo Gambescia 
 Site de la « Revue des Sciences Sociales » fondée par Julien Freund
 Guerre et polémologie dans la pensée de Julien Freund, par Jean-Baptiste Pitiot
 War and Peace in the Political Philosophy of Julien Freund

1921 births
1993 deaths
New Right (Europe)
Catholic philosophers
French political scientists
Carl Schmitt scholars
20th-century French philosophers
French sociologists
Academic staff of the University of Strasbourg
20th-century political scientists